The Vassar Chapel, built in 1904, is the main religious building at Vassar College, and is the largest religious edifice in Poughkeepsie, New York. Although it has been altered, repaired, and acoustically improved, it is one of the few buildings at Vassar that has not undergone considerable renovation. Each semester, the College community gathers in the Chapel for fall and spring convocations, in which the President and a notable member of the faculty deliver addresses.

Architecture

Architecturally, the style of the building is Norman, and is constructed from 'seamed' Cape Ann granite with sandstone trimmings.

Notes

References

External links 
Vassar Library Website
Vassar College
Vassar Encyclopedia

Vassar College buildings
Churches in Poughkeepsie, New York
University and college chapels in the United States
Churches completed in 1904
Neo-Norman architecture in the United States
1904 establishments in New York (state)